Hailesboro is a hamlet and census-designated place in St. Lawrence County, New York, United States. Its population was 624 as of the 2010 census. Hailesboro has a post office with ZIP code 13645. New York State Route 58 and New York State Route 812 pass through the community.

Geography

References

Hamlets in St. Lawrence County, New York
Hamlets in New York (state)
Census-designated places in St. Lawrence County, New York
Census-designated places in New York (state)